The 2016–17 Maccabi Petah Tikva season was the club's 107th season since its establishment in 1912, and 4th straight season in the Israeli Premier League since promoting from Liga Leumit in 2012–13.

During the 2016–17 campaign the club have competed in the Israeli Premier League, State Cup, Toto Cup.

Season review
Following the departure of Dani Golan at the end of the previous season, the club signed the team's former player and manager Kobi Refua.

The club started the season in the Toto Cup, but failed to progress beyond the group stage. In the League, the club went off to a good start, reaching second place after 5 rounds and losing only 4 matches in the regular season, including remaining unbeaten for 10 matches, securing its place in the championship playoffs. However, a run of 7 losses meant the club lost the third place to Beitar Jerusalem by the end of the season, and with Bnei Yehuda Tel Aviv winning the cup (with a penalty victory over second-placed Maccabi Tel Aviv, the club failed to reach the Europa League.

Throughout the season, the club played 44 matches, winning 18, drawing 11 and losing 15. Two players, Gidi Kanyuk and Guy Melamed placed in the league's top ten scorers.

Match results

Legend

League

State Cup

Maccabi Petah Tikva lost 1–3 on aggregate.

Toto Cup

Player details
List of squad players, including number of appearances by competition

|}

Transfers

In

Out

See also
 List of Maccabi Petah Tikva F.C. seasons

References

2016–17 in Israeli football
Maccabi Petah Tikva F.C. seasons
Maccabi Petah Tikva